Dybo is a surname. Notable people with the surname include:

Anna Dybo (born 1959), Russian linguist
Vladimir Dybo (born 1931), Russian linguist

See also
Dybo's law
Dybo (disambiguation)